Churchtown is a civil parish in County Westmeath, Ireland.

Churchtown is one of 9 civil parishes in the barony of Rathconrath in the Province of Leinster.

Churchtown civil parish comprises 16 townlands: Ballynafearagh, Balrath, Churchtown, Clontinteen, Coyne, Crissaun, Croughal, Dundonnell, Glomerstown, Jamestown, Milltown, Nicholastown, Rathcore, Redmondstown, Rogerstown and Taghboyne.

The neighbouring civil parishes are: Mullingar to the north–east,
Dysart to the east, Castletownkindalento the south, Conry to the west and Rathconrath to the north–west.

References

External links
Churchtown civil parish at the IreAtlas Townland Data Base
Churchtown civil parish at townlands.ie
Churchtown civil parish at The Placenames Database of Ireland

Civil parishes of County Westmeath